White Christmas is a 1954 American musical dance film directed by Michael Curtiz and starring Bing Crosby, Danny Kaye, Rosemary Clooney, and Vera-Ellen. Filmed in Technicolor, it features the songs of Irving Berlin, including a new version of the title song, "White Christmas", introduced by Crosby in the 1942 film Holiday Inn.

Produced and distributed by Paramount Pictures, the film is notable for being the first to be released in VistaVision, a widescreen process developed by Paramount that entailed using twice the surface area of standard 35mm film; this large-area negative was also used to yield finer-grained standard-sized 35mm prints.

Plot
On Christmas Eve in Europe in 1944, at the height of World War II, former Broadway star Captain Bob Wallace and aspiring performer Private Phil Davis entertain the 151st division with a soldier's show. The men have just received word their beloved Major General Thomas F. Waverly has been relieved of his command. Waverly arrives and delivers an emotional farewell. The men send him off with a rousing chorus of "The Old Man". After Waverly departs, enemy bombers attack the area and everyone takes cover. Phil pulls Bob away from a collapsing wall and is wounded by debris. Bob asks how he can pay back Phil for saving his life, and Phil suggests they become a duo act. Bob is not fond of the idea, but feels obliged to agree.

After the war, the two make it big, first as performers, then as producers, launching a hit musical, Playing Around. They receive a letter supposedly from their old Mess Sergeant, Ben "Freckle Face" Haynes, asking them to view his sisters' act. They watch Betty and Judy sing at Novello's, a Florida nightclub. Phil, who likes to play matchmaker, notices Bob is interested in Betty. After the performance, the four meet, and Phil and Judy immediately hit it off. Betty and Bob, however, argue about Bob's cynicism, and the fact it was actually Judy who wrote the letter instead of Ben. 

Finding out from Judy that the girls' landlord is falsely suing them for a damaged rug, and has even gone so far as to call the police to get his money, Phil gives them tickets he and Bob had purchased to spend Christmas in New York City. Bob and Phil improvise a performance to buy the girls time, then flee to the train, where they now have to sit up in the Club Car, much to Bob's chagrin.

The girls convince Phil and Bob to forgo New York and spend Christmas with them in Pine Tree, Vermont, where they are booked as performers. Upon arriving in Vermont, they find all the tourists have left due to no snow and unseasonably warm weather. They arrive at the empty Columbia Inn and are aghast to discover that General Waverly is the landlord of the hotel, has sunk his life savings into it, and is on the verge of bankruptcy. Phil and Bob decide to invite some of the cast of Playing Around to Pine Tree to stage a show to draw in the guests, and include Betty and Judy in the show. Betty and Bob's romance starts to bloom.

Later, Bob discovers Waverly received a humiliating rejection letter to his request to rejoin the army. Bob determines to prove to the General he is not forgotten, and calls up Ed Harrison, another old Army buddy who now has his own variety show, for help. Ed suggests they put the general on the show and make a big scene of his misfortune and Bob's kindness, which would be free advertising for Bob and Phil. Bob strongly rejects the idea. Unfortunately, the housekeeper Emma eavesdrops on the other phone for the first half of the conversation. She relays Ed's idea to Betty, who becomes suddenly cold towards a baffled Bob.

Phil and Judy stage a phony engagement, thinking Betty is trying to avoid romance because she does not want to leave Judy unprotected. However, this backfires when Betty accepts a gig in New York and leaves. Phil and Judy admit the truth to Bob, who becomes enraged and hurries to New York to tell Betty. They partially reconcile, but Bob meets up with Harrison before he has a chance to find out what really was bothering her. Betty sees Bob go on Harrison's show and invite the entire 151st division to secretly join him at Pine Tree to surprise General Waverly, at Bob and Phil's expense. Realizing she was mistaken, Betty returns to Vermont just in time to be in the show.

Once again on Christmas Eve, the soldiers surprise General Waverly with another rousing chorus of "The Old Man" when he arrives at the show, bringing him to tears. During the performance, Betty and Bob become engaged, and Judy and Phil decide to go through with their own engagement. As everyone sings "White Christmas", a thick snowfall at last blankets Vermont.

Cast

Production
Irving Berlin suggested a movie based on his song in 1948. Paramount put up the $2 million budget and only took 30% of the proceeds.

Mel Frank and Norman Panama were hired to add material for Danny Kaye. They felt the whole script needed rewriting, and Curtiz agreed. "It was a torturous eight weeks of rewriting", said Panama. Frank said "writing that movie was the worst experience of my life. Norman Krasna was a talented man but... it was the lousiest story I'd ever heard. It needed a brand new story, one that made sense." They did the job at $5,000 a week.

Principal photography took place between September and December 1953. The film was the first to be shot using Paramount's new VistaVision process, with color by Technicolor, and was one of the first to feature the Perspecta directional sound system at limited engagements.

Casting 

White Christmas was intended to reunite Crosby and Fred Astaire for their third Irving Berlin showcase musical. Crosby and Astaire had previously co-starred in Holiday Inn (1942) – where the song "White Christmas" first appeared – and Blue Skies (1946). Astaire declined the project after reading the script and asked to be released from his contract with Paramount. Crosby also left the project shortly thereafter, to spend more time with his sons after the death of his wife, Dixie Lee. Near the end of January 1953, Crosby returned to the project, and Donald O'Connor was signed to replace Astaire. Just before shooting was to begin, O'Connor had to drop out due to illness and was replaced by Danny Kaye, who asked for and received a salary of $200,000 and 10% of the gross. Financially, the film was a partnership between Crosby and Irving Berlin, who shared half the profits, and Paramount, which got the other half.

Within the film, a number of soon-to-be famous performers appear. Dancer Barrie Chase appears unbilled, as the character Doris Lenz ("Mutual, I'm sure!"). Future Oscar winner George Chakiris also appears as one of the stone-faced black-clad dancers surrounding Rosemary Clooney in "Love, You Didn't Do Right by Me". John Brascia leads the dance troupe and appears opposite Vera-Ellen throughout much of the movie, particularly in the "Mandy, “Choreography" and “Abraham” numbers. The photo Vera-Ellen shows of her brother Benny (the one Phil refers to as "Freckle-faced Haynes, the dog-faced boy") is actually a photo of Carl Switzer, who played Alfalfa in the Our Gang film series, in an army field jacket and helmet liner.

A scene from the film featuring Crosby and Kaye was broadcast the year after the film's release, on Christmas Day 1955, in the final episode of the NBC TV show Colgate Comedy Hour (1950–1955).

Music
 "White Christmas" (Crosby)
 "The Old Man" (Crosby, Kaye, and Men's Chorus)
 Medley: "Heat Wave " / "Let Me Sing and I'm Happy" / "Blue Skies" (Crosby & Kaye)
 "Sisters" (Clooney & Trudy Stevens)
 "The Best Things Happen While You're Dancing" (Kaye with Trudy Stevens)
 "Sisters (reprise)" (lip synced by Crosby and Kaye)
 "Snow" (Crosby, Kaye, Clooney & Trudy Stevens)
 Minstrel Number: "I'd Rather See a Minstrel Show" / "Mister Bones" / "Mandy" (Crosby, Kaye, Clooney & Chorus)
 "Count Your Blessings (Instead of Sheep)" (Crosby & Clooney)
 "Choreography" (Kaye)
 "The Best Things Happen While You're Dancing (reprise)" (Kaye & Chorus)
 "Abraham" (instrumental)
 "Love, You Didn't Do Right By Me" (Clooney)
 "What Can You Do with a General?" (Crosby)
 "The Old Man (reprise)" (Crosby & Men's Chorus)
 "Gee, I Wish I Was Back in the Army" (Crosby, Kaye, Clooney & Stevens)
 "White Christmas (finale)" (Crosby, Kaye, Clooney, Stevens & Chorus)

All songs were written by Irving Berlin.  The centerpiece of the film is the title song, first used in Holiday Inn, which won that film an Oscar for Best Original Song in 1942. In addition, "Count Your Blessings" earned the picture its own Oscar nomination in the same category.

The song "Snow" was originally written for Call Me Madam with the title "Free", but was dropped in out-of-town tryouts. The melody and some of the words were kept, but the lyrics were changed to be more appropriate for a Christmas movie. For example, one of the lines of the original song is:

A composer's demo of the original song can be found on the CD Irving Sings Berlin.

The song "What Can You Do with a General?" was originally written for an un-produced project called Stars on My Shoulders.

Trudy Stevens provided the singing voice for Vera-Ellen, including in "Sisters". (The first edition of Vera-Ellen's biography by David Soren made the mistake of suggesting that "perhaps" Clooney sang for Vera in "Sisters". The second edition of the biography corrected that error by adding this: "Appropriately, they sing "Sisters" with Rosemary Clooney actually dueting with Trudy Stabile (wife of popular bandleader Dick Stabile), who sang under the stage name Trudy Stevens and who had been personally recommended for the dubbing part by Clooney. Originally, Gloria Wood was going to do Vera-Ellen's singing until Clooney intervened on behalf of her friend.") It was not possible to issue an "original soundtrack album" of the film, because Decca Records controlled the soundtrack rights, but Clooney was under exclusive contract with Columbia Records. Consequently, each company issued a separate "soundtrack recording": Decca issuing Selections from Irving Berlin's White Christmas, while Columbia issued Irving Berlin's White Christmas. On the former, the song "Sisters" (as well as all of Clooney's vocal parts) was recorded by Peggy Lee, while on the latter, the song was sung by Clooney and her own sister, Betty.

Berlin wrote "A Singer, A Dancer" for Crosby and his planned co-star Fred Astaire; when Astaire became unavailable, Berlin re-wrote it as "A Crooner – A Comic" for Crosby and Donald O'Connor, but when O'Connor left the project, so did the song. Another song written by Berlin for the film was "Sittin' in the Sun (Countin' My Money)" but because of delays in production Berlin decided to publish it independently. Crosby and Kaye also recorded another Berlin song ("Santa Claus") for the opening WWII Christmas Eve show scene, but it was not used in the final film. Their recording of the song survives, however, and can be found on the Bear Family Records 7-CD set titled Come On-A My House.

Reception

Box office
White Christmas earned $12 million in theatrical rentals – equal to $ in  – making it the highest-grossing film of 1954. It was also the highest-grossing musical film at the time, and ranks among the top 100 popular movies of all time at the domestic box office when adjusted for inflation and the size of the population in its release year of 1954. Overall, the film grossed $30 million at the domestic box office.

Critical reaction
Bosley Crowther of The New York Times was not impressed: "...the use of VistaVision, which is another process of projecting on a wide, flat screen, has made it possible to endow White Christmas with a fine pictorial quality. The colors on the big screen are rich and luminous, the images are clear and sharp, and rapid movements are got without blurring—or very little—such as sometimes is seen on other large screens. Director Michael Curtiz has made his picture look good. It is too bad that it doesn't hit the eardrums and the funnybone with equal force." William Brogdon of Variety wrote: "White Christmas should be a natural at the boxoffice, introducing as it does Paramount's new VistaVision system with such a hot combination as Bing Crosby, Danny Kaye and an Irving Berlin score...Crosby and Kaye, along with VV, keep the entertainment going in this fancifully staged Robert Emmett Dolan production, clicking so well the teaming should call for a repeat ... Certainly he [Crosby] has never had a more facile partner than Kaye against whom to bounce his misleading nonchalance." 

Harrison's Reports wrote: "Although not sensational, White Christmas is a pleasing entertainment. There are, however, spots where it becomes quite slow and boresome, the slowness in the action being caused by the many rehearsals in preparation of the big show. On the whole the action is pleasing and it puts the spectator in a happy frame of mind. The Irving Berlin songs are, of course, an important part of the attraction, and all are tuneful." Philip K. Scheuer of the Los Angeles Times positively reviewed the film as a "great, big, physically glittering, two-hour Technicolor musical that sounds like a dream production with a dream cast." A review in Time magazine described the film as "a big fat yam of a picture richly candied with VistaVision (Paramount's answer to CinemaScope), Technicolor, tunes by Irving Berlin, massive production numbers, and big stars. Unfortunately, the yam is still a yam." The website's consensus reads "It may be too sweet for some, but this unabashedly sentimental holiday favorite is too cheerful to resist."

Home media
White Christmas was released on VHS in 1986 and again in 1997. The first US DVD release was in 2000. It was subsequently re-released in 2009, with a commensurate Blu-ray in 2010. The film was reissued in a 4-disc "Diamond Anniversary Edition" on October 14, 2014. This collection contains a Blu-ray with supplemental features, two DVDs with the film and an audio commentary by Clooney, and a fourth disc of Christmas songs on CD. These songs are performed individually by Crosby, Clooney, and Kaye.

Stage adaptation

A stage adaptation of the musical, titled Irving Berlin's White Christmas premiered in San Francisco in 2004 and has played in various venues in the United States, such as Boston, Buffalo, Los Angeles, Detroit and Louisville. The musical played a limited engagement on Broadway at the Marquis Theatre, from November 14, 2008, until January 4, 2009. The musical also toured the United Kingdom from 2006 to 2008. It then headed to the Sunderland Empire in Sunderland from November 2010 to January 2011 after a successful earlier run in Manchester, and continued in various cities with a London West End run at the end of 2014.

See also
 List of Christmas films

References

External links

 
 
 
 
 "White Christmas heads to Marquis" Variety August 4, 2008
 Official site White Christmas the Musical
 Internet Broadway Database listing

1954 films
1954 musical comedy films
1954 romantic comedy films
1950s Christmas comedy films
1950s Christmas films
1950s English-language films
1950s romantic musical films
American Christmas comedy films
American musical comedy films
American romantic musical films
Backstage musicals
Films about veterans
Films adapted into plays
Films directed by Michael Curtiz
Films scored by Irving Berlin
Films set in 1944
Films set in 1954
Films set in Florida
Films set in New York City
Films set in Vermont
Paramount Pictures films
Western Front of World War II films
1950s American films